The 2017–18 UEFA Youth League Domestic Champions Path was played from 27 September to 22 November 2017. A total of 32 teams competed in the Domestic Champions Path to decide 8 of the 24 places in the knockout phase of the 2017–18 UEFA Youth League.

Times up to 28 October 2017 (first round) were CEST (UTC+2), thereafter (second round) times were CET (UTC+1).

Draw
The youth domestic champions of the top 32 associations according to their 2016 UEFA country coefficients entered the Domestic Champions Path. If there was a vacancy (associations with no youth domestic competition, as well as youth domestic champions already included in the UEFA Champions League path), it was first filled by the title holders should they have not yet qualified, and then by the youth domestic champions of the next association in the UEFA ranking.

For the Domestic Champions Path, the 32 teams were drawn into two rounds of two-legged home-and-away ties. The draw was held on 29 August 2017, 14:00 CEST, at the UEFA headquarters in Nyon, Switzerland. There were no seedings, but the 32 teams were split into groups defined by sporting and geographical criteria prior to the draw.
In the first round, the 32 teams were split into four groups. Teams in the same group were drawn against each other, with the order of legs decided by draw.
In the second round, the 16 winners of the first round were split into two groups: Group A contained the winners from Groups 1 and 2, while Group B contained the winners from Groups 3 and 4. Teams in the same group were drawn against each other, with the order of legs decided by draw.

Format

In both rounds, if the aggregate score was tied after full-time of the second leg, the away goals rule was used to decide the winner. If still tied, the match was decided by a penalty shoot-out (no extra time was played). The eight second round winners advanced to the play-offs, where they were joined by the eight group runners-up from the UEFA Champions League Path.

First round

The first legs were played on 26 and 27 September, and the second legs were played on 17 and 18 October 2017.

|}

Notes

Internazionale won 5–2 on aggregate.

Zimbru Chișinău won 7–3 on aggregate.

Željezničar won 4–3 on aggregate.

Lokomotiva Zagreb won 4–2 on aggregate.

Esbjerg won 4–2 on aggregate.

Legia Warsaw won 3–1 on aggregate.

3–3 on aggregate. Molde won 5–4 on penalties.

Ajax won 6–0 on aggregate.

Red Bull Salzburg won 5–0 on aggregate.

Nitra won 2–1 on aggregate.

Sparta Prague won 7–1 on aggregate.

Honvéd won 3–2 on aggregate.

Brodarac won 2–1 on aggregate.

Krasnodar won 11–2 on aggregate.

Shakhtyor Soligorsk won 4–2 on aggregate.

Saburtalo Tbilisi won 2–1 on aggregate.

Second round

The first legs were played on 29, 31 October and 1 November, and the second legs were played on 21 and 22 November 2017.

|}

Molde won 2−0 on aggregate.

1–1 on aggregate. Željezničar won on away goals.

Internazionale won 10−1 on aggregate.

Ajax won 4–3 on aggregate.

3–3 on aggregate. Brodarac won on away goals.

Nitra won 3−2 on aggregate.

Krasnodar won 9−1 on aggregate.

Red Bull Salzburg won 6–2 on aggregate.

References

External links
UEFA Youth League (official website)
UEFA Youth League history: 2017/18

2
September 2017 sports events in Europe
October 2017 sports events in Europe
November 2017 sports events in Europe